The New Centre (NC) was a Christian-democratic political party in Andorra. The party was founded in 2005 as a merger between the Andorran Democratic Centre and Century 21 political parties after they had been in an electoral alliance since 2001. For the 2009 Andorran parliamentary election, the party joined the centre-right Reformist Coalition, which gained 11 seats in the General Council of the Valleys.

References

External links
Official website 

Christian democratic parties in Europe
Political parties in Andorra
2005 establishments in Andorra
Political parties established in 2005
Political parties disestablished in 2011